VadFest (Vadodara International Art and Culture Festival), organized by Art and Culture Foundation Vadodara under the aegis of Vadodara International Art and Culture Festival Authority, Government of Gujarat and Gujarat Tourism, is an initiative to promote and restore Vadodara as a cultural capital of India. It is one of India's biggest art and cultural festivals. Vadodara is famous for its rich heritage, fine arts, performing arts, iconic architecture, industrious nature and academic infrastructure. The first such festival was on 23–26 January 2015.

VadFest 2015
VadFest 2015 was an international art and culture festival spread across the four-day Republic Day weekend (from January 23 to 26) 2015. Legends from across India and around the world graced the cityscape for a fabulous four-day celebration of art, music, dance, drama, culture, food and a special kids’ theater fest. NRIs and people from 42 countries attended the first VadFest.

VadFest showcased some of the finest performances, illustrious artists and a program remarkably kaleidoscopic in diversity.

Garvi Gujarat Festival
Sugam Sangeet (16-Jan-2015): Prahar Vora, Kalyani Kauthalkar, Bhaumik Trivedi, Aanal Vasavada
Gujju Rocks (16-Jan-2015): Parthiv Gohil, Bhoomi Trivedi
Lok Nritya (17-Jan-2015): Dang Tribal dance, Katchchi dance and Saurashtra dance
Lok Dayro (17-Jan-2015): Sairam Dave, Shahbuddin Rathod, Abhesinh Rathod, Farida Mir, Suraj Mir, Chand Mir, Arvind Barot
Shaam-e-Mushayra (18-Jan-2015): Rahat Indori, Khalil Dhantejvi, Rajendra Shukla, Shobhit Desai
Shaam-e-Ghazal (18-Jan-2015): Manhar Udhas
Vadodara Day (19-Jan-2015): Achal Mehta, Ashit Desai, Garima Khiste, Gautam Dabir, Dr Kirti Sahay, Megha Bhosle, Sanat Pandya

Main Events
Live-in-concerts: Yanni along with his daughter Krystal, A R Rahman, Sunidhi Chauhan, Sonu Nigam, Kailash Kher
Music: Flute by Pandit Hariprasad Chaurasia, Sivamani Trio, Rahul Sharma & Buddy Wells
Theatre: Anupam Kher, Sharman Joshi, Paresh Rawal
Dance: Shiva Shakti by Isha Sharvani, Geeta Chandran
VadMasters: Zoya Akhtar, Homi Adajania, Makarand Deshpande and Sriram Raghavan moderated by Rajesh Mapuskar 
Vintage Car show 
Fine Arts
Food Festival: Royal cuisine
Garvi Gujarat: Geodesic Craft dome shell structure, 2015 cm (66 running ft) Pithora Painting’s Live Demonstration, More than 40 National Award Winning Artisans, Live Demonstration of Handicraft & Handloom in Craft Village, Tribal Museum, Handicraft & Handloom Exhibition, Craft Theme Pavilion

Venues
 Sir Sayajirao Nagar Gruh
 Luxmi Vilas Palace
 Gandhinagar Gruh
 FGI Auditorium
 Navlakhi ground
 Polo ground
 The M S University pavilion
 Prof C C Mehta general auditorium
 Mayfair Atrium
 Fine Arts College, The M S University of Baroda
 Kirti Mandir
 Gulab Baug
 Samta Ground, Subhanpura, Vadodara
 Inox, Race course circle
 SAMTA GROUND

Artists and Event Show line-up

Controversies
Three BJP MLAs had decided to stay away from VadFest quoting they have not received invitation of Garvi Gujarat festival. Later it was resolved.

See also
 Vadodara
 Baroda State
 Vadodara district
 Cultural Festival in India

References

Festivals in Gujarat
Entertainment events in India
Cultural festivals in India
Arts festivals in India
Music festivals in India
Theatre festivals in India
Food and drink festivals in India
Film festivals in India
Dance festivals in India
Vadodara